Hum Paanch is an Indian sitcom that first aired from 1995 to 1999. The series returned for a second season from 2005 to 2006. The show starred Ashok Saraf, Vidya Balan, Rakhee Tandon, Bhairavi Raichura, and Vandana Pathak.

Plot
Hum Paanch is the story of a middle-class white-collar worker, Anand Mathur, who always finds himself in trouble because of his five daughters — Meenakshi, Radhika, Sweety, Kajal, and Chhoti. The three elder daughters are Anand and his first wife's children. The last two are Anand and Bina's daughters.

Together, the five girls plan to do something new in every episode. Anand's first wife, who is dead, speaks to him through her portrait on the living room wall; his second wife, Bina, generally supports the daughters' ideas. The show was a runabout success, helping to establish Zee TV.

When the show returned for a second season, Anand had returned from a long stay in the United States. Meenakshi and Radhika were married, Meenakshi was married to Purush whom she treats like a servant and shouts at. Radhika is married to Daljeet Singh whom the other sister's call 'Pape'. He is a scientist and invents many things which get the girls into trouble. He has a forgetfulness problem — he forgets people's names and basic things. Meenakshi's daughter is known as Damini, and Radhika's daughter's name is Gudiya.

Characters
 Anand Mathur attended Kallubhai Lallubhai Koylawala Municipal School in his childhood and later on received his B.A. with excellent scores (first class). He works as a sales representative in a medicine factory. Anand Mathur married his second wife, Bina Mathur, on 17 January.
 Bina Mathur is from a village called Baliya. Her complete name is Binadevi Anandkumar Janardhan Prasad Mathur. When Anand Mathur went to Bina's house for her hand in marriage, his three elder daughters were with him. According to Bina, she married Anand because the three daughters hurt her ego and she wanted to exact revenge on them. Upon seeing her for the first time, Meenakshi compared Bina to a loudspeaker who would create sound pollution in their lives. Radhika saw Bina as an actress Mala Sinha portraying an illiterate woman in a movie. Sweety said that Bina would lose the title of Miss Uttar Pradesh, even if Bina was the only contestant. After marrying Anand, Bina fell in love with her stepdaughters and forgot her woes. Later, Bina reveals to her daughters that her first love was Abhi who left her to go work in a diamond mine in Africa which is another reason she married Anand.
 Anand Mathur's first wife  would communicate with him through her portrait. She took great effort to make her husband's life difficult, despite being a spirit herself. However, she always helped him establish peace and gave him the best advice.
 Meenakshi, the eldest daughter, is a feminist and often dream big of bringing a change in the society. Her husband Purush is a gharjamai.
 Radhika is intelligent, nerdy and geeky. She uses a hearing aid and has a habit of bumping into doors, walls, statues, people, etc. due to her poor vision.
 Sweety is beauty without brains, whose sole purpose in life is to marry Shahrukh Khan and become an actress or a model. She feels that it is only her duty to open the house door whenever the doorbell rings. Sweety has a disciple, Babli, who adores and worships her. Babli is Anand Mathur's boss, Popatlal's daughter. Sweety authored the novel Goddess of Big Things with the help of Babli.
 Kajal is a tomboy who dresses up as a boy and gets into fistfights with thugs and goons.
 Chhoti, the youngest, is a gossip-monger. She is hailed as an incarnation of actress Meena Kumari by the people of Baliya and has a temple dedicated to her.
 Pooja aunty is a nosy neighbour who responds with, "Aunty mat kaho na" on being referred to as 'aunty'.

Cast

Season One

 Ashok Saraf as Anand Mathur
 Priya Tendulkar as Anand's first wife
 Shoma Anand as Bina Mathur
 Vandana Pathak as Meenakshi Mathur #1
 Kavita Rathod as Meenakshi Mathur #2 (replacing Vandana Pathak)
 Ritu Deepak as Meenakshi Mathur #3 (replacing Kavita Rathod)
 Neelam Sagar as Meenakshi Mathur #4 (replacing Ritu Deepak)
 Amita Nangia as Radhika Mathur #1
 Vidya Balan as Radhika Mathur #2 (replacing Amita Nangia)
 Sujata Sanghamitra as Radhika Mathur #3 (replacing Vidya Balan)
 Rakhi Vijan as Sweety Mathur
 Bhairavi Raichura as Kajal Mathur aka Kajal Bhai
 Priyanka Mehra as Chhoti #1
 Aishwarya Duggal as Chhoti #2 (replacing Priyanka Mehra)
 Anna Khan as Chotti #3 (replacing Aishwarya Duggal)
 Aruna Sangal as Pooja
Sharad Sharma as Kadar Bhai 
 Jatin Kanakia as Sunil
 Suchitra Bandekar as Babli
 Rajendra Nath / Jeetendra Bharadwaj as Popatlal, Aanand's boss

Season Two

 Ashok Saraf as Anand Mathur
 Sudha Chandran as Anand's first wife
 Shoma Anand as Bina Mathur
 Vandana Pathak as Meenakshi Mathur
 Pamela Mukherjee as Radhika Mathur
 Rakhi Vijan as Sweety Mathur
 Bhairavi Raichura as Kajal Mathur aka Kajal Bhai
 Pushtiie Shakti as Chhoti
Suchitra Bandekar as Babli
 Aruna Sangal as Pooja
 Sharad Sharma as Kadar Bhai
 Javed Pathan as Khaliya
 Ali Asghar as Purush, Meenakshi's husband
 Dheeraj Sarna as Daljeet Singh, Radhika's husband
 Naman Shaw as Satish Samoosa

Production

Development
The series was Balaji Telefilms' first, back when its office was in a garage. The show thus marked the debut of Ekta Kapoor as a producer, at the age of 16. She personally made sure that the actors did their rehearsals and improvisations. The script of the first season was written by Imtiaz Patel. According to Ashok Saraf, who played the lead role of Anand Mathur in the series, "He has written the characters so well, people got hooked with each of them. Imtiaz's work was the height of improvisation. Imtiaz Patel was so talented that he could write one episode on a single line that he read in a newspaper." The show was mainly shot in Mumbai, with huge crowds assembling whenever there were scenes shot on the streets.

Casting
The series was the debut for many of the actors, including Vandana Pathak, Vidya Balan, and Rakhi Vijan. The show was the first comedy role of Shoma Anand.

Release
It was aired on Zee TV every Tuesdays 8pm , leading to its success as a series loved by the whole family. The first season ran from 1995 to 1999, while the second from 2005 to 2006.

Reboot
A Reboot, Hum Paanch Phir Se, aired on Big Magic from 19 June 2017 to 1 March 2018 with a new cast and produced by Essel Vision Productions. The cast includes Sooraj Thapar as Anand Mathur, Seema Pandey as Bina Mathur, Vaishnavi Mahant as Priya, Jayashree Venkataramanan as Kajal, Ambalika Sapra as Radhika, Sylvia Chadha as Sweety, Ruchi Tripathi as Meeenakshi and Rimmi Srivastava as Chhoti. The series was not produced by Ekta Kapoor.

References

External links
 
 Hum Paanch Streaming on ZEE5

Balaji Telefilms television series
Zee TV original programming
Indian comedy television series
1995 Indian television series debuts
2006 Indian television series endings
Indian television sitcoms